Ash Hill is a volcano in Wiri, in the Auckland volcanic field, in New Zealand. A low tuff cone with an explosion crater about 150m wide, it is now covered by industrial development. It peaked at roughly 30 metres above sea level (approximately 8 metres higher than the surrounding land).

Ash Hill was named after nearby Ash Road by Searle. Ash Road was named after ash trees, not volcanic ash. Radiocarbon dating gave Ash Hill the age of 31,800 +/- 159 calendar years BP, a similar age to nearby Wiri Mountain.

References
City of Volcanoes: A geology of Auckland - Searle, Ernest J.; revised by Mayhill, R.D.; Longman Paul, 1981. First published 1964. .
Volcanoes of Auckland: A Field Guide. Hayward, B.W.; Auckland University Press, 2019, 335 pp. .

Auckland volcanic field